The Place Castellane is a historic square in the 6th arrondissement of Marseille, Bouches-du-Rhône, France. It was built in 1774.

History
The square was named for Henri-César de Castellane-Majastre, an aristocrat who donated the land for its construction in 1774. A fountain with an obelisk used as a lavoir was built in the middle of the square in 1798.

In 1911, the obelisk was relocated to Mazargues. Meanwhile, Jules Cantini donated a new fountain, which was designed by sculptor André-Joseph Allar. The fountain, completed in 1913, represents three Provençal rivers: the Durance, the Gardon, and the Rhône.

The square, with the original obelisk,  is mentioned by Joseph Conrad in his 1919 novel entitled The Arrow of Gold.

References

6th arrondissement of Marseille
Buildings and structures completed in 1774
1774 establishments in France
Buildings and structures in Marseille
18th-century architecture in France